Elja Hyytiäinen (born 4 January 1961) is a Finnish former cross-country skier who competed during the 1980s. She won a bronze medal in the 4 × 5 km relay at the 1984 Winter Olympics in Sarajevo.

Cross-country skiing results
All results are sourced from the International Ski Federation (FIS).

Olympic Games
 1 medal – (1 bronze)

World Championships

World Cup

Season standings

Team podiums
 7 podiums

Note:   Until the 1994 Olympics, Olympic races were included in the World Cup scoring system.

References

External links
CNN Sports Illustrated (As Eija Hyytiainen)

1961 births
Living people
People from Saarijärvi
Finnish female cross-country skiers
Cross-country skiers at the 1984 Winter Olympics
Olympic medalists in cross-country skiing
Medalists at the 1984 Winter Olympics
Olympic bronze medalists for Finland
Sportspeople from Central Finland
20th-century Finnish women